Eleonore Bjartveit (11 July 1924 – 26 September 2002) was a Norwegian politician for the Christian Democratic Party. Born in Alta, she worked as a medical doctor for several years, before entering politics. Bjartveit was elected to the Norwegian Parliament from Oslo in 1989, serving until 1993. She had previously been a deputy representative from 1981–1989, as well as Minister of Culture and Science in 1989, and Minister of Culture and Church Affairs in 1990.

She was married to Kjell Bjartveit.

References

1924 births
2002 deaths
Christian Democratic Party (Norway) politicians
Ministers of Culture of Norway
Members of the Storting
20th-century Norwegian politicians